Code Lyoko: Subdigitals is an album released by MoonScoop featuring songs by the fictional musicians The Subdigitals (formerly The Subsonics) in the French animated television series Code Lyoko. A World Without Danger was released as a physical CD single only in France, but was later imported to the several United States online retailers, including Amazon and eBay. Planet Net was released as a music video single in order to promote the release of the soundtrack.

Track listing

References

External links

Code Lyoko
2006 albums
2007 albums
Television soundtracks
Animated television articles needing attention
Caroline Records albums